Madison John Hughes (born October 26, 1992) is a rugby union player who was the captain of the United States national rugby sevens team from 2014 until he stepped away from the team in late 2021. Hughes was named captain of the United States national team at the start of the 2014 Sevens World Series, shortly after the appointment of new head coach Mike Friday.

Hughes captained the US Eagles to their highest ever finish in the sevens series (sixth place) in the 2014/2015 season, a significant improvement on the team's 12th place finish the previous year. This feat was matched with another strong year in the 2015/2016 Season, where Hughes was the highest points scorer in the World Series.

Hughes was the second highest scorer for the 2015 series with 296 points. In the last leg of the series Hughes lead the Eagles to victory at the 2015 London Sevens, and was named player of the tournament at that event.  Though American in status, he was born in England.

Early life
Hughes attended Wellington College, in England where he played rugby from 2006 to 2011. Wellington College is a public school which has also produced rugby players such as James Haskell, Thom Evans and  Max Evans. He was also a member of the Wellington cricket, rackets and soccer teams, playing to county level for cricket, representing Surrey.

College rugby 
Hughes played college rugby as a fullback for Dartmouth College, and also played on Dartmouth's rugby sevens team. Hughes began playing with Dartmouth rugby as an 18-year-old freshman becoming the club captain by his junior year.

Hughes rose to national prominence with his performance for Dartmouth at the Collegiate Rugby Championship. Hughes was named to the CRC All-Tournament team in 2012, 2013, and again in 2014. In the 2012 CRC, Hughes was the tournament's third-leading try scorer with six tries. In the 2013 CRC, Hughes was the second-leading try scorer with eight tries and the second-leading points scorer with 58.

Hughes was captain of the 2013 7s All Americans and the 2014 15s All Americans.

United States national teams

Sevens
Hughes debuted with the United States national rugby sevens team in the 2013–14 season. Hughes was the leading scorer for the U.S. at the 2014 Wellington Sevens (33 points) and 2014 Japan Sevens (28 points).

For the 2014–15 season, Hughes was named team captain for the 2014 Gold Coast Sevens in October 2014, even though at 21 he was the youngest player in the team.  Hughes again captained the USA 7's team to a sixth place finish in the 2015/2016 season, becoming the highest points scorer in the world for the year. Hughes was the U.S. starting scrum-half at the 2016 Summer Olympics.

Fifteens
Hughes played fullback for the United States national under-20 rugby union team. Hughes was the top scorer of the tournament at the 2012 IRB Junior World Rugby Trophy with 72 points, and was the U.S. leading try-scorer with four tries.

Hughes debuted for the United States national rugby union team fifteen a-side team in 2016, playing at fullback. He recorded three caps for the Eagles in 2016 before returning to rugby sevens for the remainder of the 2016-17 season.

See also
 Collegiate Rugby Championship
 United States national rugby sevens team

References

External links
 
 Madison Hughes at USA Rugby
 
 
 
 
 
 

1992 births
Living people
Dartmouth College alumni
American rugby union players
United States international rugby sevens players
Rugby sevens players at the 2015 Pan American Games
Olympic rugby sevens players of the United States
Rugby sevens players at the 2016 Summer Olympics
Pan American Games medalists in rugby sevens
Pan American Games bronze medalists for the United States
United States international rugby union players
Medalists at the 2015 Pan American Games
Rugby sevens players at the 2020 Summer Olympics